Quincy Tavares Mojica, known as Quincy Tavares (born 1 February 2001) is a Dutch professional football midfielder of Curaçaoan descent who plays for NAC Breda in the Eerste Divisie. Earlier in his career, he was known as Quincy Hogesteger.

Club career
He made his league debut for Dordrecht on 17 August 2018 in their 0–0 home draw against Helmond Sport.

In the summer 2021, he moved to NAC Breda, where he was initially assigned to the Under-21 squad. He made his debut for the main squad of NAC on 27 August 2021 against ADO Den Haag, he came on as a substitute in the 87th minute and received a direct red card 7 minutes later.

References

External links 
 
 
 Quincy Hogesteger profile on the FC Dordrecht official website

2001 births
Footballers from Rotterdam
Dutch people of Curaçao descent
Living people
Eerste Divisie players
FC Dordrecht players
NAC Breda players
Association football midfielders
Dutch footballers